James Bolabiu (born 25 May 1983 in Suva, Fiji) is a Fijian international rugby union referee and Fiji's most experienced referee. He also officiated at the 2008 IRB Junior World Championship held in Wales.

After officiating at the 2008 Tri Nations Series, Bolabiu had a two-month stint in South Africa in the Currie Cup First Division competition. He was the first Fijian referee to officiate at the IRB Sevens World Series. He also refs in the Pacific Nations Cup.

Bolabiu was selected as a match official for the 2016 Summer Olympics.

References

External links
SA Rugby Profile

1983 births
Fijian rugby union referees
Living people
Sportspeople from Suva
I-Taukei Fijian people